The Hong Kong Air Cadet Corps is a voluntary uniformed group (although employees working at headquarters are paid) subsidised by the Home Affairs Bureau of the Hong Kong government and is registered under the Societies Ordinance as a non-profit making charitable organisation.

Created in 1971 with ties to the British Armed Forces' Combined Cadet Force, it is an aviation-orientated, disciplined youth organisation; aiming to provide its members with initial aviation education, to develop their leadership capabilities and to promote their social awareness through community service. It is also an organisation supported by Cathay Pacific Airways and Dragon Air for aviation training.

Apart from training in aviation knowledge, the HKACC also organises outdoor activities such as parachuting, rifle drill, familiarisation visits, hiking, night journeys, field training camp, and even flag days. In the summer, canoe courses and other aquatic activities are organised. In addition members of the Corps are obliged to take part in community service.

They are divided into 7 wings, Hong Kong Island, New Territories East, New Territories West, Kowloon East, Kowloon West, No 6 and Operations Support Wings. Those wings are further divided into squadrons; each squadron consists of a minimum of 35 cadets. Most of the squadrons are based at secondary schools for recruitment and training purposes.

Organisation

The Commanding Officer of the Hong Kong Air Cadet Corps is Group Captain LEE Kwok Wing. As HKACC chief executive officer, the Commanding Officer is responsible to the Executive Board for the Corps day-to-day operations.

The Commanding Officer Office co-ordinates a number of specialist functions at headquarters level, namely administration of the Honorary Officers Scheme; legal affairs; vocational qualifications; and liaison with the British and Canadian Air Cadet Organisations.

The Administration & Support Group discharges the administrative and support functions necessary for the daily running of the Corps. Its portfolio encompasses the routine administrative function of capital project, personnel, financial and properties management; organisation of adventure activities; information technology; interface with government policy bureaux and funding agencies; public affairs; logistics and supplies; and medical support.

The missions of the Institutional Advancement Group include liaison with the Central Government, government departments, mainland organisations, parents and other uniformed groups; international and mainland exchanges; and special developmental projects.

The Operations Group is in direct command of the five operational wings, and is responsible for organising and co-ordinating the activities of cadet and university squadrons. The Operations Group sees to that the functioning of its subordinate units are in line with the training objectives set out by the Headquarters, and that the Corps community services commitments are satisfactorily fulfilled.

The Training Group establishes the training standards and syllabus within the Corps. Such standards are constantly updated in light of community needs and technical advancements. The Training Group also runs advanced and specialist courses such as aviation education programmes; adult training; cadet non-commissioned officer training; and skills training.

The Flying Squadron organises air experience activities for the Corps. It also oversees flight operations and flight safety according to Civil Aviation standards.

Advanced Aviation Education Programme (AAEP) Scholarship 
The AAEP was first introduced in 1997 and available only to members of HKACC and other uniformed youth organisations. In 2000, AAEP opened its door to the general public and it was in that year that Cathay Pacific Airways became the co-organiser of the Programme. The Community College of City University (now UOW College Hong Kong) joined as the third co-organiser. The Programme aims to provide the participants with the ground training necessary to take the Australian Civil Aviation Safety Authority General Flying Practical Test (GFPT).

Participants who passed all assessments will be awarded with a Certificate of Achievement issued by HKACC. AAEP graduates can apply for credit exemption when applying for the Associate Degree of Science in Airport Operations and Aviation Logistics (AScAOAL) offered by the UOW College Hong Kong. HKACC cadets who have passed the Programme will be deemed to have passed all Aviation Education (AE) subjects as required for the achievement of the Senior Cadet and Staff Cadet classifications.

Participants must complete the following 8 compulsory subjects divided into two modules which comprise a total of 20 sessions:

Technical modules
 Aerodynamics (ADY)
 Aircraft general Knowledge (AGK)
 Operation, performance and planning (PERF)
 Flight rules & air laws in Australia (LAW)
Navigation Modules
 Navigation (NAV)
 Meteorology (MET)
 Radio Communication (RT)
 Human Performance and Limitation (HPL)
Practical module
 Flight Simulation Training*(FST) conducted by instructors of the New Zealand (HK) Flight Training Academy

Squadrons

Most of the squadrons of the Hong Kong Air Cadet Corps are part of the Operations Group, which is divided into six wings, numbered one to six, and the Ceremonial Squadron under Ceremonial Wing, Training Group.

Ranks

Fleet

Helicopters used for flight experience in Hong Kong include:

 Robinson R44
 Eurocopter EC120

Glider training is provided by Canada/Australia and private flying clubs in Canada / New Zealand.

See also
 Air Training Corps
 Australian Air Force Cadets
 Royal Canadian Air Cadets
 Civil Air Patrol
 New Zealand Air Training Corps

References

External links

 Official organisation web site
 Air Cadet FAQ
 HKACC Summer Camp 2007

Youth organisations based in Hong Kong
Air Cadet organisations
1971 establishments in Hong Kong
Youth organizations established in 1971
Military of Hong Kong under British rule